The Miami Maniac (often shortened to just The Maniac) is the official mascot of the University of Miami baseball program at the University of Miami in Coral Gables, Florida. 

Sebastian the Ibis is the official mascot of the Miami Hurricanes sports program except for its college baseball program, which is represented by Miami Maniac, the team's mascot, who performs at University of Miami baseball games. 

Created in 1982 by visionary College Baseball Hall of Fame head coach Ron Fraser in 1982 and originally performed by John Routh, the Miami Maniac has been a constant at Mark Light Field ever since.

Miami Maniac has an anthropomorphic body with a sports orange fur on most of his body combined with patches of green on his head and nose. He usually wears a University of Miami baseball jersey with the number 1/2 on it.

History
The Miami Maniac first appeared as the Miami Hurricanes baseball in 1982 and was played by a University of South Carolina undergraduate student named John Routh, who helped create the South Carolina Gamecocks' mascot Cocky. Routh's performance as Cocky at Gamecock baseball games had such a positive response that he was invited to the 1981 College World Series to perform as the Series' official mascot. Then University of Miami head baseball coach Ron Fraser witnessed Cocky's performance at the College World Series and was impressed. Fraser was always looking for opportunities to promote Hurricane baseball and college baseball in general and decided to create a mascot specifically for Hurricane baseball.

The following year, in 1982, Fraser and a major University donor helped create the Miami Maniac. They decided to introduce the Maniac during University of Miami's series against Florida State that year and invited Routh down from South Carolina to show students how to work a crowd. At the end of the 1982 season, in which the Hurricanes won their first College World Series championship, Fraser offered Routh a permanent position as assistant director of marketing, which included performing as both the Miami Maniac and Sebastian the Ibis. Routh, who had just graduated from the University of South Carolina, accepted the position. During his tenure at the University of Miami, Routh created many of the cheers now associated with Miami Hurricanes athletics. Miami Maniac developed the "C-A-N-E-S... Canes!" cheer, which has become a popular tradition among University of Miami football fans.

Wedding
In March 1985, the Miami Maniac married Mrs. Maniac, who was performed by Nancy Vasquez, in a ceremony during a game between the Hurricanes and the Maine Black Bears. The fourteen-minute ceremony was broadcast in its entirety to a live national television audience on ESPN and was conducted by longtime Miami Hurricane baseball and University of Miami football announcer Jay Rokeach. Sebastian the Ibis, the mascot for all other University of Miami sporting events, served the Maniac's best man in the 1985 ceremony. Others in attendance included Budweiser's Bud Man, McDonald's character Grimace, and McGruff the Crime Dog.

Other events
In addition to performing at Miami Hurricanes baseball games and other university functions, the Maniac performs at various sporting and charity events. The Maniac has appeared at various Minor League Baseball games throughout Florida and has entertained in 49 of the 50 U.S. states and in Europe and Japan.

From 1983 through 1991, the Maniac was the official mascot of the NCAA Division 1 College World Series in Omaha, Nebraska, although the character had to wear a neutral jersey during each series to avoid being seen as holding favoritism towards the 'Canes when they were a College World Series participant.

References

External link
Official website

Atlantic Coast Conference mascots
Miami Hurricanes baseball
1982 establishments in Florida